The 1963–64 NBA season was the Detroit Pistons' 16th season in the NBA and seventh season in the city of Detroit.  The team played at Cobo Arena in Detroit.

The Pistons finished with a 23-57 (.288) record, last place (5th) in the Western Division.  The team was led on the season by forward Bailey Howell (21.6 ppg, 10.1 rpg, NBA All-Star), center Ray Scott (17.6 ppg, 13.5 rpg) and guard Don Ohl 17.3 ppg, NBA All-Star.  

The Pistons bristled under coach Charles Wolf, with Sports Illustrated describing the team as "the unhappiest team ever assembled. Wolf did not smoke or drink or swear or run around late at night and he was hell-bent on making sure no one else did either. Midseason practice sessions consisted of push-ups, sit-ups and lectures. "We had to raise our hand if we wanted to go to the bathroom," said one player. And during a game, one missed shot or bad pass meant a trip to the pines, as Piston center Reggie Harding refers to bench time. 'I'd trade every one of you,' Wolf once told his players in an effort to build up their confidence, 'except you're so bad no one will have you.'"

Draft picks

Roster

Regular season

Season standings 

x – clinched playoff spot

Record vs. opponents

Game log

References 

Detroit Pistons seasons
Detroit
Detroit Pistons
Detroit Pistons